Legislative elections were held in Mexico on 6 July 1997. The Institutional Revolutionary Party won 239 of the 500 seats in the Chamber of Deputies, the first time it had failed to win a majority. As a result, the leaders of the Party of the Democratic Revolution and of the National Action Party were able to control Congress and installed PRD member Porfirio Muñoz Ledo as the president of the Chamber of Deputies. At first, the PRI refused to accept the nomination and its parliamentary leader, Arturo Núñez Jiménez, declared it illegal. However, the PRI later accepted the fact and Muñoz Ledo answered the state of the union address of President Ernesto Zedillo.

Following the elections, the Party of the Cardenist Front of National Reconstruction, the Popular Socialist Party and the Mexican Democratic Party lost their legal registrations and subsequently disappeared. Voter turnout was between 57% and 58%.

Results

Senate

Chamber of Deputies

References

Mexico
Legislative
Legislative elections in Mexico
June 1997 events in Mexico